Villanueva is a parish in Santo Adriano, a municipality within the province and autonomous community of Asturias, in northern Spain.

The population in 2006 was 119. The postal code is 33115.

The Asturian people of this parish celebrate feast days:
 Carmen, 16 July
 San Román, 9 August

External links
 Asturian society of economic and industrial studies, English language version of "Sociedad Asturiana de Estudios Económicos e Industriales" (SADEI)

Parishes in Santo Adriano